Cecil Elaine Eustace Smith, later Gooderham, then Hedstrom (September 14, 1908 – November 9, 1997), was a Canadian figure skater. In 1924 she became the first female figure skater to represent Canada at Winter Olympics; she placed sixth individually and seventh in pairs, together with Melville Rogers. At the 1928 Winter Olympics she finished fifth individually. In 1930, she won the silver medal at the World Figure Skating Championships in singles.

Biography
In 1922, Smith won the national junior title, and next year was a runner-up as a senior. Aged 15, she participated in the 1924 Winter Olympic Games, held in Chamonix, France. In the women's singles, she finished sixth, two places ahead of Sonja Henie. In the pairs competition, she placed seventh.

Smith won the Canadian championship in 1925 and 1926. In 1928, she competed in her second Olympics and place fifth in the women's singles (Sonja Henie claimed the gold). In 1930, she became the first Canadian to win a World championship figure skating medal, earning a silver medal in New York City. In 1991 she was inducted into the Skate Canada Hall of Fame.

Smith changed her last name twice, first to Gooderham, then to Hedstrom. Around 1935 she gave birth to a son named Edward Douglas Gooderham. She had an elder sister Maude, who also competed at the 1928 Olympics, but in pairs. Their mother, Maude Delano-Osborne, won the 1892 Canadian tennis championship.

Competitive highlights

Ladies' singles

Pairs
(with Rogers)

(with Reburn)

References

1908 births
1997 deaths
Canadian female single skaters
Canadian female pair skaters
Figure skaters at the 1924 Winter Olympics
Figure skaters at the 1928 Winter Olympics
Olympic figure skaters of Canada
Figure skaters from Toronto
World Figure Skating Championships medalists